This article contains a list of glands of the human body

List of endocrine and exocrine glands

Skin
There are several specialized glands within the human integumentary system that are derived from apocrine or sebaceous gland precursors.  There are no specialized variants of eccrine glands.

Endocrine glands
See List of human endocrine organs and actions

References

 Michael H. Ross & Wojciech Pawlina, Histology: A Text and Atlas

 
Glands